The 2008 1000 km of Nürburgring was the fourth round of the 2008 Le Mans Series season.  It took place at the Nürburgring, Germany, on 17 August 2008.

Race results
Class winners in bold.  Cars failing to complete 70% of winner's distance marked as Not Classified (NC).

† - Both #6 Team Oreca-Matmut and #21 Epsilon Euskadi failed to complete the final lap of the race, therefore they are not classified in the final results.

Statistics
 Pole Position - #7 Team Peugeot Total - 1:39.492
 Fastest Lap - #7 Team Peugeot Total - 1:40.501
 Average Speed -

References

External links
 Le Mans Series - Nürburgring

Nurburgring
6 Hours of Nürburgring
Nurburgring